Sixberry Lake is located by Redwood, New York. The outlet flows into Millsite Lake. Fish species present in the lake are northern pike, smallmouth bass, lake trout, landlocked salmon, walleye, yellow perch, atlantic salmon, and bluegill. There is a state owned hard surface ramp on the lake off County Route 21.

See also
Camp Tousey

References 

Lakes of Jefferson County, New York